The Chennai Bypass Road is a full-access controlled expressway that interconnects four radial Indian National Highways around Chennai, India covering a distance of  from Perungalathur (near Tambaram) on NH-32 to puzhal on NH-16 via Maduravoyal at a cost of  4.05 billion. Constructed as part of the National Highway Development Project to decongest the city of transiting vehicles, the expressway interconnects NH-32, NH-48, NH-716 and NH-16.  This expressway now forms a part of the circular transportation corridor.

Phases

Phase I 
The first phase is  six-lane fully access controlled carriageway from Perungalathur on the Grand Southern Trunk Road (NH 32) to Maduravoyal which lies on the Chennai–Bangalore NH-48. A 3-tier trumpet interchange has also been constructed at the starting point at Irumbuliyur. It was inaugurated in April 2008. The Road runs through Thiruneermalai, Pammal, Anakaputhur, Tharapakkam, Kovur, Porur, Vanagaram to reach Maduravoyal.

Phase II 
It also includes two interchanges. A clover-leaf grade separator at Maduravoyal Junction and a trumpet interchange at puzhal where the bypass phase II ends.

Elevated Road 
A  elevated six-lane corridor forms the part of the Phase II being executed currently. This elevated road cuts through the Industrial Estate in Ambattur. This corridor ends with a Road over bridge (RoB) crossing the Chennai–Jolarpet railway line. The elevated corridor was completed in June 2009 at a cost of  1000 million.

Interchanges 

 A 3-tier interchange connecting NH32 at Irumbuliyur. This place is where the bypass begins.
 An elevated cloverleaf interchange at Maduravoyal to connect it with the Chennai Port–Maduravoyal Expressway and the proposed Maduravoyal–Sriperumbudur dry port expressway.
 A trumpet interchange at Puzhal

Gallery

See also 
 Coimbatore bypass

References 

Chennai HSCTC
Roads in Chennai
Expressways in Tamil Nadu
Ring roads in India